The Rocky Mountain College of Art + Design (RMCAD) is a private for-profit art school in Lakewood, Colorado.  The college was founded in 1963 by Philip J. Steele, an artist and teacher.

History 
RMCAD was founded in 1963 by Philip J. Steele, an artist and educator. The college relocated several times as it increased enrollment. In 2003, the college moved from its three-building Denver location to its current and larger location in the suburb of Lakewood. In 2010, a group of investors who own Full Sail University purchased a controlling share of the college from the Steele family, and began an initiative to restructure the college and curriculum. In 2014, amidst a turnover of a significant number of key faculty, RMCAD rescheduled its in-person campus courses to align with the scheduling of online classes, and to cut costs moved most liberal arts courses on line. Currently, RMCAD is affiliated with Full Sail University.

Academics 
RMCAD is accredited by the Higher Learning Commission (HLC) and the National Association of Schools of Art and Design. The Interior Design program is accredited by the Council for Interior Design Accreditation.

Students 
Approximately 1,400 undergraduate students with a student body is 66% female, 34% male, 41% minorities and international students. Seventy-nine percent of students are out-of-state.

Student to instructor ratio is above average at nine students for every instructor and the average class size is eight students. The average age of on-campus students is 23 and the average online student is 30.

Campus 
Rocky Mountain College of Art + Design campus comprises . The RMCAD campus has the designation of National Historic District. Currently, the campus has 17 structures, 11 of which are devoted to classrooms, common areas, and other support spaces, including four galleries and studio spaces. The campus is the former site of the Jewish Consumptives' Relief Society (JCRS) and its successor organization, the American Medical Center, included in the National Register of Historic Places listings in Jefferson County, Colorado and is located in the 40 West Arts District close to Casa Bonita. The campus is located in the city of Lakewood, Colorado which is between the city of Denver and the foothills of Colorado's Front Range mountains.

Galleries 
The college has four main galleries; the Philip J. Steele Gallery, Rude Gallery, Alumni Gallery, and Student Gallery. The Philip J. Steele Gallery is the largest gallery on campus and is named after the founder of the college. Rude Gallery is a more intimate space in the Rude Building, and the Alumni Gallery is located in the main foyer of the Texas building. The student gallery is located in the EPiC building.

References

External links 

 

Art schools in Colorado
Private universities and colleges in Colorado
Education in Jefferson County, Colorado
Education in Lakewood, Colorado
Universities and colleges in Denver
Educational institutions established in 1963
1963 establishments in Colorado
For-profit universities and colleges in the United States